In Norse law, a  was a freed slave (a freed thrall).

A  had the right to be penalized for some types of wrongdoing, rather than receiving physical punishment.

References

Medieval law
Slavery in Europe
Slavery in Norway
Norse culture
Slavery in Denmark
Slavery in Sweden